Guácimo and Pococí Protected Zone, is a protected area in Costa Rica, managed under the Tortuguero Conservation Area, it was created in 1987 by executive decree 17390-MAG-S. Located in the Limón Province of northeastern Costa Rica, it protects the recharge area of the Guácimo and Pococí rivers.

References 

Nature reserves in Costa Rica
Protected areas established in 1987
Geography of Limón Province